The Academy of Interactive Entertainment (AIE) is an Australian video games and computer animation school. Founded in 1996, it was one of the world's first institutions to offer qualifications in these industries. The AIE provides courses covering CGI, animation, video game asset creation and games programming. Campuses are located in Canberra, Sydney, Melbourne, Adelaide, and an online campus.  The Australian ABC has said that the AIE "is one of Australia's most awarded 3D animation, game design and visual FX educators".

Campuses

Canberra
The first AIE campus was established in Watson, a suburb of Canberra ACT, in 1996. In 2015 AIE submitted a proposal to the ACT government to transform the old Watson high school site – on which AIE is currently located – into a large education precinct, at an estimated cost of $111 million. The proposed development will enable the production of feature films, along with facilities to create special effects for films and games.  On site, there will be accommodation providing for 400 students.

Adelaide
AIE Adelaide has developed a four-player game which is projected onto the facade of a former cinema with four artists pitted against each other to paint platforms as they compete to reach a painting at the top of the screen.

Partnerships
AIE partners with other organisations including Microsoft, with Sony Computer Entertainment Europe, with Nnooo and the University of Canberra.

Students and courses

Student study options
A range of student support options are available for prospective AIE students.

Courses
3D Animation
Certificate II in Creative Industries (Media) (3D Animation Foundations)
Advanced Diploma of Screen and Media (3D Animation and Visual FX)
Advanced Diploma of Professional Game Development (Game Art and Animations)

Game Design
Certificate III in Media (Game Design Foundations)
Advanced Diploma of Professional Game Development (Game Design & Production)

Game Programming
Certificate II in Information Technology (Game Programming Foundations)
Certificate II in IDMT (Game Programming Foundations)
Advanced Diploma of Professional Game Development (Game Programming)
Bachelor's degree of Games and Virtual Worlds (Programming)

Awards
2016
 Australian, Vocational education and training (VET) Awards – Small Training Provider of the Year.

2015
Short animated film Lovebites collected awards and screenings at Dubai, Melbourne International Film Festival and many others.

2013
Tropfest 22 Finalist and Winner of the Cadetship Award for student film, Still Life

2012
Australian Training Awards – Small Registered Training Organisation of the Year (finalist)
ACT Training Awards – Small Registered Training Organisation of the Year (winner)

2008 
 Tropfest finalist and best animation award for Fault.

2007
Australian National Training Authority – Small Training Provider of the Year (winner)
ACT Training Excellence Awards – Small Registered Training Organisation of the Year
 One of the top 16 finalists in Tropfest 2007 with The Story of Ned.

See also

 Micro Forté
 Video game industry

References

External links
 Website for Academy of Interactive Entertainment

1996 establishments in Australia
Animation schools in the United States
For-profit universities and colleges in the United States
Science and technology in Australia
Universities and colleges in Seattle
Video game universities
Australian tertiary institutions